For the 1924 Olympic Monotype sailing a National Dinghy Class from France was used. Some documents refer to this class as the Meulan and in France as Monotype national. It might originate (or vice versa) as the Scheldejol a Class originated in Antwerp, Belgium and also used in The Netherlands but is a little different at certain measurements. At least more sail area, including a spinnaker and a 10 cm more beam.

Olympic history 
The competitors at the 1924 Olympics held their regattas at two places: 
 One, in the English Channel, of the coast of Le Havre for the 3 persons 6 Metre and the 5 persons 8 Metre and
 Two, at the river Seine near Meulan near Paris for the single handed monotype centerboard.
The Olympic International Congress made on December 7, 1921 the decision that the host country would make the choice for the Monotype class. L'Union des sociétés nautiques française  (USNF), chooses the French national Monotype of the naval architect Gaston Grenier, especially designed with the Olympic Games of 1924 in mind. A class which emphasizes the qualities of the sailor, whose sailrobe would include a spinnaker, and was adapted to the expected light air conditions.

For the Olympic races 16 Meulans were made available for the 17 sailors. So a rotation scheme had to be used. Ten of the yachts where identical, but the others were little different. It might be worth investigating if these six boats were Scheldejollen and that they were used to accommodate the unexpectedly high number of competitors. The Dutch Wikipedia stated that the Scheldejol was used at the Olympics.

Olympic results

References

 Nederlands Scheepvaartmuseum Amsterdam : Scheepvaartmuseum

 
Dinghies
Olympic sailing classes
1920s sailboat type designs